Fallon is an Irish surname and refers to the clan name Ó Fallamháin or Ó Fallúin.

The original Gaelic form of the name Fallon is O Fallamhain. Early Origins of the Fallon family The surname Fallon was first found in Galway (Irish: Gaillimh) part of the province of Connacht, located on the west coast of the Island, where they held a family seat from very ancient times. The origin of the surname in Irish is "Leader" or "granddaughter/grandson of a rich king." The Irish surname meaning “governor” or “supremacy.” Some have maintained that Fallon was originally pronounced with a long “a” as in “fall.”

In Ireland, Fallon is exclusively a surname rather than a given name. However outside of Ireland, particularly in the United States, it is occasionally used as a gender-neutral given name. This usage is not traditionally Irish, and to Irish ears may sound incorrect or out of place.

Notable people with the surname Fallon:

 Brian Fallon (born 1980), American singer-songwriter and musician
 Brian Fallon (born 1982), American political activist
 Craig Fallon (1982–2019), British judoka
 Ed Fallon (born 1958), American politician and activist
 George Fallon (baseball) (1914–1994), American baseball player
 George Hyde Fallon (1902–1980), U.S. Congressman
 James H. Fallon (born 1947), American neuroscientist
 Jennifer Fallon (born 1959), Australian author
 Jim Fallon (born 1950), Scottish footballer and coach
 Jim Fallon (born 1965), English rugby player
 Jimmy Fallon (born 1974), American actor, comedian, and television host
 John Fallon (disambiguation), multiple people
 Jonathan Fallon, rugby player
 Kevin Fallon (born 1948), English-New Zealand soccer coach
 Kieren Fallon (born 1965), Irish jockey
 Lucy Fallon (born 1995), English actress
 Matt Fallon (born 1965), American singer
 Michael Fallon (born 1952), British politician
 Neil Fallon (born 1971), American singer
 Órla Fallon (born 1974), Irish singer and songwriter
 Richard Fallon (disambiguation), multiple people
 Rory Fallon (born 1982), New Zealand footballer
 Sean Fallon (disambiguation), multiple people
 Siobhan Fallon Hogan (born 1961), American actress and comedian
 Tiffany Fallon (born 1974), American model 
 Thomas Fallon, mayor of San Jose, California
 William J. Fallon (born 1944), U.S. Navy admiral

Characters
 Bernard Fallon, the alter-ego of Alfred Borden in The Prestige

References

Surnames of Irish origin